The following is a list of notable Indian think tanks

India has the second-largest number of think tanks in the world, with the country's total hitting 509 in 2018 behind 1871 in the United States of America and ahead of the People's Republic of China (507), the United Kingdom (321), and Argentina (227). Many of these are headquartered at its capital New Delhi and range from government aided organisations to privately funded ones.

Several Indian think tanks usually feature in the annual Global Go To Think Tank Index produced by the Lauder Institute of University of Pennsylvania. In 2018, the "Observer Research Foundation" was the highest ranked among the India-based think tanks.

See also
 List of think tanks

References

Further reading
 Malone, David M., C. Raja Mohan, and Srinath Raghavan, eds. The Oxford handbook of Indian foreign policy (2015) excerpt pp 270–284.

Think tanks

India